Matthew Erickson is a Canadian voice actor who works for Ocean Studios in Vancouver, British Columbia, Canada and the Calgary, Alberta-based Blue Water Studios.  He was born and raised in rural Alberta. He has played several roles in anime, most notably Zoids: Chaotic Century, Zoids: Guardian Force, Shinn Asuka in Gundam Seed Destiny and Amuro Ray in Zeta Gundam.

Anime roles 
Banner of the Stars - Jinto Lin
Banner of the Stars II - Jinto Lin
Betterman - Keita Aona
Beyblade Burst Evolution - Django Del Torro
Ceres, The Celestial Legend - Yuhi Aogiri
Crest of the Stars - Jinto Lin
Dragon Ball GT - Trunks (Blue Water dub)
Fancy Lala - Yoshio
Hikaru No Go - Yoshitaka Waya
Mobile Fighter G Gundam - Domon Kasshu (teen)
Mobile Suit Gundam SEED Destiny - Shinn Asuka
Mobile Suit Gundam SEED Destiny: Special Edition - Shinn Asuka
Mobile Suit Zeta Gundam - Amuro Ray
Nana - Nobuo "Nobu" Terashima
Shakugan no Shana - Hayato Ike (Season 1)
The Daichis - Earth Defence Family - Yashiro's Underling
The Story of Saiunkoku - Ryuren Ran, Soldier 2, Vassal
Zoids: Chaotic Century - Van Flyheight

Other animation
The Little Prince - Semitone (The Planet of Time, episodes 7–8)
Sabrina: Secrets of a Teenage Witch - Harvey Kinkle

Video game roles 
Mobile Suit Gundam: Journey to Jaburo - Kai Shiden
Mobile Suit Gundam: Gundam vs. Zeta Gundam - Amuro Ray (0087)
Dynasty Warriors: Gundam 2 - Shinn Asuka
Dynasty Warriors: Gundam 3 - Shinn Asuka

External links

References

1980 births
Living people
Canadian male voice actors
Male actors from Alberta
Male actors from Vancouver